Ouadda Airport  is a rural airstrip serving Ouadda, a village in the Haute-Kotto prefecture of the Central African Republic.

See also

Transport in the Central African Republic
List of airports in the Central African Republic

References

External links 
OpenStreetMap - Ouadda Airport
OurAirports - Ouadda Airport
FallingRain - Ouadda Airport

Airports in the Central African Republic
Buildings and structures in Haute-Kotto